"I Don't Want to See You Like This" is the second single from the Joy Formidable's debut album, The Big Roar, released by Atlantic Records on digital download and EP as well as a 7" picture disc. A music video for the song was released on 27 September 2010 and was directed by Martin Rhys Davies.

Track listing
7"
I Don't Want to See You Like This - 4:04
Whirring (Instrumental Harp Version)

iTunes EP
I Don't Want to See You Like This - 4:04
While the Flies - 3:31
Popinjay - 3:04
Ostrich - 4:30

iTunes single
I Don't Want to See You Like This - 4:04
I Don't Want to See You Like This (Grouplove Remix) -3:42
Popinjay (live) - 3:19

Personnel
 Ritzy Bryan – composer, guitar, vocals
 Rhydian Dafydd Davies – bass, composer, illustrations, vocals
 Matt Thomas – drums

References

2010 singles
2010 songs
The Joy Formidable songs
Atlantic Records singles